National Court of Spain
National Court (Iceland)
National Court (Papua New Guinea)

See also
Cour nationale du droit d'asile